The 1988–89 international cricket season was from September 1988 to April 1989.

Season overview

September

Australia in Pakistan

October

1988-89 Champions Trophy

1988 Asia Cup

November

New Zealand in India

West Indies in Australia

December

1988–89 Benson & Hedges World Series

February

Pakistan in New Zealand

March

India in the West Indies

1989 Sharjah Cup

References

1988 in cricket
1989 in cricket